WWE Fastlane is a professional wrestling event produced by WWE, a professional wrestling promotion based in Connecticut. It is broadcast live and available only through pay-per-view (PPV) and the livestreaming services Peacock and the WWE Network. The event was established in 2015 and replaced Elimination Chamber in the February slot of WWE's pay-per-view calendar; Elimination Chamber was pushed back to May that year. The name of the event was a reference to its position on the "Road to WrestleMania", being held in the two-month period between the Royal Rumble and WWE's flagship event. 

Beginning in 2017, the event moved to March, which made it WWE's first non-WrestleMania PPV to be held in March. With the reintroduction of the brand extension, Fastlane was Raw-exclusive in 2017 and SmackDown-exclusive in 2018 before WWE discontinued brand-exclusive PPVs following WrestleMania 34 that year. The event was produced annually until 2020 when Fastlane was removed from the schedule to allow WWE to hold that year's Super ShowDown PPV; however, Fastlane was reinstated in 2021, but this would be the final Fastlane event, as it was again discontinued. The 2021 event was also WWE's first PPV available to stream on Peacock in the United States before the American version of the WWE Network merged under Peacock and shut down on April 4, which also made it the final PPV available to stream on the American WWE Network before its closure; this did not affect other countries, which maintained the separate WWE Network service.

History
WWE first held Fastlane on February 22, 2015, in  Memphis, Tennessee, and it was broadcast live on pay-per-view (PPV) and the WWE Network. For the 2015 calendar year, it replaced Elimination Chamber, which had been held in February from 2010 to 2014; the 2015 Elimination Chamber was in turn held in May. The name "Fastlane" was chosen as a reference to its position on the "Road to WrestleMania", being held in the two-month period between the Royal Rumble and WWE's flagship event. 

The event returned in 2016, also in February, thus establishing Fastlane as an annual PPV for the promotion. In 2017, Fastlane was pushed back to March, with Elimination Chamber returning to its original February slot, which made Fastlane the first non-WrestleMania PPV to be held in March. The 2017 event was also held as a Raw-exclusive show, following the reintroduction of the WWE brand extension in mid-2016 where the promotion again split its roster into brands where wrestlers exclusively perform. The 2018 event was then made a SmackDown-exclusive PPV, but this would be the final SmackDown-exclusive PPV, as well as WWE's final brand-exclusive PPV, as following WrestleMania 34 that year, brand-exclusive PPVs were discontinued. In 2020, Fastlane was removed from the schedule to allow WWE to hold that year's Super ShowDown PPV; however, Fastlane was reinstated in 2021. Due to the COVID-19 pandemic, the 2021 event was held in WWE's bio-secure bubble called the WWE ThunderDome, hosted at Tropicana Field in St. Petersburg, Florida.

The 2021 event was WWE's first PPV event to air on Peacock's WWE Network channel in the United States, following the merger of the American WWE Network under Peacock on March 18 that year. Fastlane was held during the transitional period (March 18 – April 4) and was simulcast on Peacock and the American WWE Network, which in turn made it the final PPV to air on the American WWE Network as following this transitional period, the American WWE Network shut down on April 4; this did not affect other countries, which maintained the separate WWE Network service.

In October 2021, WWE revealed their PPV calendar for 2022, and Fastlane was not included. While there had been a to be announced event for February, on January 17, 2022, this event was revealed as Elimination Chamber. Fastlane was in turn discontinued without a formal announcement.

Events

See also 
 List of WWE pay-per-view and WWE Network events

References

External links 

 
Recurring events established in 2015